Epic Garden Music is the debut studio album by English post-punk band Sad Lovers & Giants. It was released in 1982 on the band's own record label, Midnight Music.

Track listing

Release 

Epic Garden Music reached No. 21 on the UK Indie Chart.

Legacy 

A track from the album was featured in the book 1001 Songs You Must Hear Before You Die.

Personnel 

 Garce – vocals
 Cliff Silver – bass guitar
 Tristan Garel-Funk – guitar
 David Wood – keyboards, saxophone
 Nigel – percussion

 Technical

 Nick Ralph – production
 Steve Burgess – production
 Black Graphics – sleeve design
 Joe Bull – engineering
 Cliff Ash – cover photography

References

External links 

 

1982 debut albums
Sad Lovers & Giants albums